Harold Andrew "Duke" Dejan (February 4, 1909 – July 5, 2002) was an American jazz alto saxophonist and bandleader in New Orleans. Dejan is best remembered as leader of the Olympia Brass Band, including during the 1960s and 1970s when it was considered the top band in the city.

Born into a Creole family in New Orleans, he took clarinet lessons as a child before switching to saxophone, and became a professional musician in his teens, joining the Olympia Serenaders and then the Holy Ghost Brass Band.  He played regularly in Storyville, at Mahogany Hall, and on Mississippi riverboats.  He also worked in the mail office of the Lykes Brothers Steamship Company for 23 years, and, in World War II, played in Navy bands.

He returned to his day job and his parallel musical career after the war, leading his own band, Dejan's Olympia Brass Band, from 1951.  The band often appeared at Preservation Hall, recorded nine albums, and also toured internationally, making 30 concert tours of Europe and one of Africa.   It featured in the James Bond movie Live and Let Die, and in many TV commercials.

Dejan suffered a stroke in 1991, which left him unable to play the saxophone, but continued as a band leader and singer until shortly before his death.

References

1909 births
2002 deaths
Jazz musicians from New Orleans
American jazz saxophonists
American male saxophonists
20th-century American saxophonists
20th-century American male musicians
American male jazz musicians
Olympia Brass Band members
Eureka Brass Band members